John King Griffin (August 13, 1789 – August 1, 1841) was a U.S. Representative from South Carolina.

Born near Clinton, South Carolina, Griffin pursued an academic course.
He engaged as a planter.
He served in the State house of representatives 1816–1819.
He served as member of the State senate 1820–1824 and again in 1828.

Griffin was elected as a Nullifier to the Twenty-second through Twenty-fifth Congresses and reelected as a Democrat to the Twenty-sixth Congress (March 4, 1831 – March 3, 1841).
He died near Clinton, South Carolina, August 1, 1841.
He was interred in Little River Church Cemetery.

Sources

1789 births
1841 deaths
American planters
Nullifier Party members of the United States House of Representatives
Nullifier Party politicians
Democratic Party South Carolina state senators
Democratic Party members of the South Carolina House of Representatives
People from Clinton, South Carolina
Democratic Party members of the United States House of Representatives from South Carolina
19th-century American politicians